Mariam Farid may refer to:
Mariam Mamdouh Farid (born 1998), Qatari athlete
Mariam Farid (kickboxer), Australian kickboxer